Richard R. Samuels (c. 1844–1878) was a farmer, blacksmith and state legislator in Arkansas.  He was a delegate to the 1868 Arkansas Constitutional Convention from Hempstead County, Arkansas. He was one of 8 African American delegates at the convention. He represented Hempstead County, Arkansas in the Arkansas House of Representatives in 1868 and 1869. He was a Republican. He was one of the first six African Americans to serve in the Arkansas Legislature. At The Brindle Convention in 1872 he was nominated for the position of superintendent of the penitentiary. He also served on the grand jury for a fraud and corruption trial in Hempstead. Later in 1872 he was elected as clerk for Hempstead to serve with James W. Vance who was re-elected as the Sheriff. A few months later judge T. G. T. Steele put a restraining order on Samuels and Thomas M. Higgs commanding them not to exercise their duties of clerk and deputy sheriff. T. G. T. Steele then later issued writs for the arrest of Samuels, Mitchell and Higgs for contempt of these order but was then himself investigate by the Senate for his conduct and exceeding his jurisdiction.

He came from Washington County, Arkansas where he had been a respected blacksmith.

See also
African-American officeholders during and following the Reconstruction era

References

Republican Party members of the Arkansas House of Representatives
People from Washington County, Arkansas
People from Hempstead County, Arkansas
1844 births
1878 deaths
American blacksmiths
Farmers from Arkansas
African-American politicians during the Reconstruction Era
African-American farmers
African-American state legislators in Arkansas